Texinfo is a typesetting syntax used for generating documentation in both on-line and printed form (creating filetypes as , , , etc., and its own hypertext format) with a single source file. It is implemented by a computer program released as free software of the same name, created and made available by the GNU Project from the Free Software Foundation.

The main purpose of Texinfo is to provide a way to easily typeset software manuals. Similar to the LaTeX syntax, all the normal features of a book, such as chapters, sections, cross references, tables and indices are available for use in documents. Using the various output generators that are available for Texinfo, it is possible to keep several documentation types up-to-date (such as on-line documentation provided via a Web site, and printed documentation, as generated using the TeX typesetting system) using only a single source file.

The official Texinfo documentation states that the first syllable of "Texinfo" is pronounced so as to rhyme with "speck", not "hex"; this pronunciation is derived from the pronunciation of TeX, in which the X represents the Greek letter chi rather than the English letter x. The maintainers state that "Texinfo" should be written with only a capital "T" and the rest of the letters in lower case.

Output formats 

In order to make it possible for several documentation output formats to be updated all at once, upon changing the original Texinfo (.texi) source file, several syntax converters are available that can be used to generate translations of the Texinfo file into other formats. Most of these are created using the  program, which is part of the GNU Texinfo distribution.

HTML
(Generated via .) As HTML is the standard language for documents presented on the World Wide Web, this output format can effectively be used to produce online documentation pages. The manual notes that the  program attempts to restrict its output files to a certain subset of HTML markup that can be read by as many browsers as possible.
DVI
(Generated via .) The device independent file format is output by the TeX typesetting system, and can be used for generating device-specific commands that can be viewed or printed; for example, translation to PostScript ( files).
PDF
Based on the PostScript language, this format was developed by Adobe Systems for portable document interchange. Like the PostScript format, it can represent the exact appearance of a document and supports arbitrary scaling. It is intended to be platform-independent and can be viewed with a large variety of software. Texinfo uses the  program, a variant of TeX, to output PDF.
Docbook
(Generated via .) This is an XML-based markup language for technical documentation that bears some resemblance to Texinfo, in broad outlines. It is also possible to convert Docbook files to Texinfo, using the  program.
XML
(Generated via .) For general purposes.
Info
(Generated via .) This is a specific format which essentially is a plain text version of the original Texinfo syntax in conjunction with a few control characters to separate nodes and provide navigational elements for menus, cross-references, sections, and so on. The Info format can be viewed with the  program.

Man output 
Notably, man is not available as an output format from the standard Texinfo tools.  While Texinfo is used for writing the documentation of GNU software, which typically is used in Unix-like environments such as Linux, where man pages are the traditional format for documentation, the rationale for this is that man pages have a strict conventional format, used traditionally as quick reference guides, whereas typical Texinfo applications are for tutorials as well as reference manuals.  As such, no benefit is seen in expressing Texinfo content in man page format.  Moreover, many GNU projects eschew man pages almost completely, referring the reader of the provided man page (which often describes itself as seldom maintained) to the Info document.

Texinfo source file 
Texinfo enables structuring a document like a book with chapters, sections, cross references and indices. The source is almost plain text, but technically it is formatted text marked up by commands that begin with "@".  A sample of a part of a source file:

@ifnottex
@node Top
@top Short Sample

@insertcopying
@end ifnottex

@menu
* First Chapter::    The first chapter is the
                     only chapter in this sample.
* Index::            Complete index.
@end menu

The commands mark structure such as chapters or denote a part of the source to be processed only for certain types of output.

History and status 
Texinfo is used as the official documentation system for the GNU Project. Texinfo is licensed under the GNU General Public License.

The Texinfo format was created by Richard M. Stallman, combining another system for print output in use at MIT called BoTeX, with the online Info hyperlinked documentation system, also created by Stallman on top of the TECO implementation of Emacs. BoTeX itself was based on an earlier system called Bolio (associated with David A. Moon, and used for documentation of the Lisp Machine), converted to use TeX for its output. Robert Chassell helped Stallman to create the first translator to create Info in Emacs Lisp. Texinfo is "loosely based on Brian Reid's Scribe and other formatting languages of the time".

The Texinfo software distribution development was led by Brian Fox (up to version 3.8), Karl Berry (through version 5.2), and by Gavin Smith (since Dec. 2014).

In February 2014, Eric S. Raymond wrote that Stallman had decided to phase out texinfo in the future after discussions with him. The replacement would be a combination of HTML and a "modern lightweight format that renders to both print and HTML".

See also
 TeX
 List of TeX extensions

Notes and references

External links 

 

Free TeX software
GNU Project software
Hypertext
Markup languages